The fourth season of Cheers, an American television sitcom, originally aired on NBC in the United States between September 26, 1985, and May 15, 1986, as part of the network's Thursday lineup. This season marks Woody Harrelson's television debut as Woody Boyd after Nicholas Colasanto, who portrayed Coach Ernie Pantusso, died during the previous season. The show was created by director James Burrows and writers Glen and Les Charles, under production team Charles Burrows Charles Productions, in association with Paramount Television.

Background 
During the previous season, 1984–85, after two years of struggling with low ratings, rapid schedule changes, and failed series, NBC's Thursday night lineup (years before the Must See TV promotional slogan was developed) consisted of, in time slot order starting at 8:00 p.m. Eastern / 7:00 p.m. Central: The Cosby Show, Family Ties, Cheers, Night Court, and Hill Street Blues, and became a ratings success for the network. The 1985–86 Thursday schedule was similar to the previous season's and was still a success.

Cast and characters

 Ted Danson as Sam Malone — bartender, owner, retired Red Sox relief pitcher
 Shelley Long as Diane Chambers — snobby waitress, the moral compass of the bar staff and patrons
 Rhea Perlman as Carla Tortelli — bitter waitress, divorced mother of six. Gives birth to Ludlow, named after his father Dr. Bennett Ludlow, Frasier's mentor. 
 John Ratzenberger as Cliff Clavin — postal carrier and virginal, loquacious bar know-it-all
 Woody Harrelson as Woody Boyd — dim small town Indiana bar-tender, hired by Sam to fill-in for the coach's absence following the latter's death.
 George Wendt as Norm Peterson — a semi-unemployed accountant, a childless husband
 Kelsey Grammer as Frasier Crane (recurring) — jilted psychiatrist
 Recurring and credited in the end credits, though appears in most episodes. In remastered prints of the episode "Cliffie's Big Score", seen on DVD and later syndication, Grammer's name appears in the opening credits, although he does not appear in the episode and is not officially credited in the opening until Season 5.

During the previous season, Sam went to Italy to stop Frasier and Diane's wedding. This season, he fails to do so, and returns to Boston. Several months later, Frasier comes to the bar to announce that Diane jilted him at the altar, made love to other men, and is now in a convent, located one hour away from Boston. Sam retrieves Diane from the convent and rehires her as a bar waitress. After having lost everything, including his career, Frasier frequently visits the Boston bar, Cheers, for drinks and then slowly degenerates into alcoholism. He recovers, then begins another psychiatric job, distancing himself from Sam and Diane's relationship. Sam then begins a relationship with the city councillor Janet Eldrige (Kate Mulgrew). Tired of being part the triangle with Sam and Diane, Janet breaks up with Sam. In the season's finale, during a telephone call, Sam proposes to an unidentified woman.

Episodes

Production

During filming of the series' third season, Nicholas Colasanto, who portrayed regular character Coach Ernie Pantusso, died of a heart attack. Rather than recast the character, Coach was written out. In the season's premiere episode, "Birth, Death, Love and Rice", it was revealed that the character of Coach had died, although no explanation was given. As a replacement for Coach, the show's producers created a new character, Woody Boyd, "an Indiana farm boy" who becomes a bartender in the bar of big city Boston, portrayed by Woody Harrelson. Before Cheers, Harrelson was an understudy in a Broadway play, Biloxi Blues, and made his film debut in Wildcats, which was released to theaters in February 1986.

Reception
In the 1985–86 season, Cheers was scheduled at 9:00 p.m. (Eastern) / 8:00 p.m. (Central) against CBS's Simon & Simon and ABC's The Colbys, which replaced Lady Blue, which moved to Saturdays in mid-November 1985. On December 26, 1985, the series gained 33 percent in the Nielsen ratings from the previous season. As of January 29, 1986, it became one of top three rated series among females, along with the other two Must See TV sitcoms, The Cosby Show and Family Ties. As of April 23, 1986, it scored an overall 23.7 rating and a 35 share, putting it into fifth place in the 1985–86 season.

Despite disdaining the Sam-and-Diane romance, and considering this series a typical sitcom in earlier seasons, television critic Rick Sherwood praised the fourth season as the "funniest [and] most intelligent" since the debut season.

The fourth season ended with the cliffhanger of Sam Malone calling and proposing to an unknown individual. A telephone survey polled callers regarding who they thought that recipient was: politician Janet Eldridge or Sam's on again/off again girlfriend Diane Chambers. Nearly 140 picked Diane, and almost 60 picked Janet. Those who voted for Janet were not fans of Janet; rather, they expected the love triangle to continue in the next season. A few of the callers polled considered Janet as "funny and appealing". The rest thought Janet was wrong for Sam.

Jeffrey Robinson of DVD Talk perceived this season as neither as great nor as strongly rewatchable nor as hilarious as earlier seasons, but worth watching, especially for fans. Robinson found its shows "episodic". Adam Arseneau of DVD Verdict described it as "impeccable and golden", with 95 percent on the story and 94 on acting. The critics deemed the introduction of a new character, Woody Boyd (even if not well-developed and well-integrated), the growing prominence of Frasier Crane, and the supposedly one-time character Lilith Sternin, who becomes a recurring character in later seasons, as highlights of the fourth season. However, they found the unexplained death of Coach Ernie Pantusso to be one of the season's low points.

Nate Meyers of Digitally Obsessed praised this fourth season as well-aged and still "fresh", especially after mostly omitting "topical humor" and developing characters. Robert David Sullivan ranked "I'll Gladly Pay You Tuesday" (1985) at number 36 in his list of top 100 favorite sitcom episodes.

Accolades 
All cast members, except newcomer Woody Harrelson and actor Kelsey Grammer (whose character Frasier Crane appears recurringly this season), were nominated for Primetime Emmy Awards in 1986. Only Rhea Perlman won her own Emmy Award, as an Outstanding Supporting Actress in a Comedy Series. The episode "Fear Is My Co-Pilot" earned the following crew an award for Outstanding Sound Mixing for a Comedy Series or Special: Michael Ballin, Robert Douglass, Douglas Grey, and Thomas J. Huth.

Shelley Long was awarded the Best Lead Actress in a Comedy Series by Viewers for Quality Television in 1986 for her performance throughout the whole season. Long also won a Golden Globe in 1985 as the Best Actress in a Musical/Comedy Series for her performance in 1985.

DVD release
The fourth season is available on DVD, with four discs in the set. On February 1, 2005, the entire season was released to Region 1 DVD with four discs in the set. Unlike DVD releases of earlier seasons, the season four set lacks special features, such as interviews and outtakes.

Notes

References 
Specific

General

Ratings sources 
According to the Daily Breeze, a newspaper from Torrance, California, the 1985–86 ratings are based on 85.9 million households with at least one television.

External links 
 Production order of Cheers (season 4) at Copyright Catalog
 Click "Set Search Limits", select "Range", select "Motion Pictures" at "Item Type", type "1985" at left box and "1986" at right box, either hit "Enter" or click "Set Search Limits"
 Then, after above step, search by title, type "Cheers", and hit "Enter" or click "Begin search"
 Cheers, season 4 at Internet Movie Database
 Cheers, season 4 at TV Guide

4
1985 American television seasons
1986 American television seasons